Butler County Regional Airport  (Hogan Field) is at 2820 Airport Road East in Hamilton, Ohio. It is owned by the Butler County Board of Commissioners.

History
A group of employees from General Electric Aircraft Engines founded the Jet Flyers' Club at the airport in the early 1950s.

It was purchased by Hamilton, Fairfield and Butler Counties in 1984. The runway was widened and lengthened in 1998.

Prior to 2000, it was known as Hamilton-Fairfield Airport.

Facilities
In the year ending June 2007, the airport had 61,687 aircraft operations, average 169 per day: 79.6% were general aviation, 20.4% were air taxi, and 0% were military. 172 aircraft are based at the airport; 138 are single-engine, 25 are multi-engine, 6 are jet, and 3 are helicopters.

Accidents and incidents
 On 15 May 2018, a small airplane crashed at the airport shortly after taking off.

References

External links
Butler County Regional Airport website
Clubs/Groups located at Butler County Regional Airport
EAA Chapter 974 (Experimental Aircraft Association)
Victory Aviation Flying Club

Airports in Ohio
Transportation buildings and structures in Butler County, Ohio
Buildings and structures in Hamilton, Ohio